Stage wagons are light horse-drawn or mule-drawn public passenger vehicles often referred to as stagecoaches. Like stagecoaches they made long scheduled trips using stage stations or posts where the horses would be replaced by fresh horses. Stage wagons were intended for use in particularly difficult conditions where standard stagecoaches would be too big and too heavy. 

This style of vehicle was often called a mud-coach or mud-wagon. More like wagons than coaches, the sides of the vehicle gave passengers little protection from the dirt of the road. Abbot, Downing named theirs an overland wagon. A brand-name, Celerity, later became popular in place of mud (wagon).

Use
They were employed wherever the poor state of the roads and or demand for services did not warrant the expense of a stagecoach. Most stagecoach routes in the United States' West were opened with them and often operators continued to use these vehicles as stagecoaches.

Structure

They were not unlike a freight wagon with a high driver's seat, bench seats on the tray, and posts holding up canvas to shelter passengers from the weather. 

Those stage wagons with throroughbraces had an undercarriage like those used by a Concord coach but the thoroughbraces were much shorter and mounted to make sure there was much less motion of the body. The thoroughbraces were brought over a bar at each end and attached to another bar above the outer side of each axle.

Stage wagon wheels and their iron tires were as much as fifty per cent wider than those of conventional stagecoaches

Development

Wagons carrying freight had been taking passengers in Europe since 1500. This particular stage wagon type was first recorded near the end of the 18th century in use in eastern North America, US and Upper and Lower Canada. It was an unsprung wagon with the driver's bench seat providing room for two more passengers beside him. It might also carry more passenger seats on the tray behind. These extra seats were reached by climbing over the driver's seat. About this time, the Postmaster General Joseph Habersham required the driver's seat to be moved from the tray onto a front wall to improve the driver's vision and by dropping the tray improve the wagon's stability. This created the characteristic stagecoach-like profile of the stage wagon.

Their relatively simple design and construction allowed them to be sold by Abbot, Downing at around half the price of full-size Concord coaches. Their suspension employed thoroughbraces that were much shorter than those used on Concord stagecoaches.

Some manufacturers

 Abbot, Downing, Concord, New Hampshire
 Milton P Henderson of Stockton California made stage wagons of the same style as Abbot, Downing. The firm began in 1869 as a partnership with E G Clark. They can be identified by the finish of the sides of the bodies and the method of attachment of iron stays back and front.
 P O LeMay and Livy Swan at Yreka, California
 Weisenhorn Carriage in Helena, Montana built a vehicle very like an Abbot, Downing Australian wagon
 Celerity was a brand of Stage wagon made in Troy, New York.

Notes

References

Wagons
Coaches (carriage)
Animal-powered vehicles
History of road transport
Horse transportation